Jan Działyński can refer to:
Jan Działyński (1489–1587), stolnik of Dobrzyń, castellan of Słońsk
Jan Działyński (1510–1583), voivode of Chełm, chamberlain of Gdańsk, Elbląg and Chełm
Jan Działyński (1590–1648), voivode of Chełm, starosta of Puck
Paweł Jan Działyński (1594–1643), voivode of Pomorze
Jan Działyński (?–1692), castellan of Elbląg